Bill Clinton Boulevard is a boulevard located in Pristina, Kosovo. Following the Kosovo War of 1998 to 1999, Albanians in Kosovo wanted to thank former U.S. President Bill Clinton for his help in their struggle with the government of Yugoslavia. A  statue of Clinton was unveiled on the boulevard on 1 November 2009, at a ceremony in which the former president spoke.

Elsewhere in Pristina, another street has also been named after U.S. President George W. Bush. In addition, several cities in Kosovo, including Prizren, have streets named after President Woodrow Wilson.

Gallery

See also
Tourism in Kosovo
History of Kosovo
Bill Clinton
Pristina
Kosovo War
Albanian Americans
Albania-United States relations
Kosovo-United States relations

References

External links
 Bill Clinton Statue on Atlas Obscura

Geography of Pristina
Transport in Pristina